12 (Force Support) Engineer Group is an engineer formation of the British Army.

History 
The group can trace its origins to 12th Engineer Brigade which was originally created to command the reserve Airfield Damage Repair regiments. In 1989 the brigade was under the command of the Eastern District, United Kingdom Land Forces and was headquartered at Waterbeach.  By 1989, the brigade had a mix of regular and reserve units. and the brigade had the following structure:

 Headquarters - RAF Waterbeach
 39th Airfield Damage Repair Engineer Regiment, Royal Engineers
 529 (Air Support) Special Team, Royal Engineers - 
 Airfields Works Group, Royal Engineers
 50 Construction Field Squadron, Royal Engineers
 216 Airfield Damage Repair Squadron, Royal Engineers (Volunteers)
 217 Airfield Damage Repair Squadron, Royal Engineers (Volunteers)
 218 Airfield Damage Repair Squadron, Royal Engineers (Volunteers)
 219 Airfield Damage Repair Squadron, Royal Engineers (Volunteers)

After the Options for Change force reductions, the brigade was re-titled as the 12 (Air Support) Engineer Group, however it remained at RAF Waterbeach.

The 12th Engineer Group was formed after the conversion of the former 12th Engineer Brigade.  In 2005, as a result of the Delivering Security in a Changing World White Paper, the group was moved under the command of the new 8th Force Engineer Brigade.  Before the initial Army 2020 changes, the group had the following structure: 

 Headquarters - RAF Waterbeach
 25th Air Support Engineer Regiment, Royal Engineers
 39th Air Support Engineer Regiment, Royal Engineers
 71st Engineer Regiment, Royal Engineers 
 73rd Engineer Regiment, Royal Engineers

Structure c.2017 

After the Army 2020 Refine reforms, the group was retitled as 12 (Force Support) Engineer Group remaining under the 8th Engineer Brigade. Its responsibilities changed from Airfield Support to "support to Theater Entry, Route Maintenance, and Enabling Airfield Operations".  The group's current structure is:

 Headquarters - Wittering
36 Engineer Regiment, Invicta Park Barracks
39 Engineer Regiment
71 Engineer Regiment - Paired with 39 Engineer Regiment
75 Engineer Regiment - Paired with  36 Engineer Regiment (Specialized in Logistical and waters crossing)

Commanders 
Commanding Officers of the group included:

 2005–2008: Col. Andrew M. Mills
 2008–2010: Col. Frank R. Noble
 2010–2013: Col. Andrew W. Phillips
 2013–2014: Col. Jason C. Rhodes
 2014–2017: Col. Matthew Quare
 2017–2020: Col. Thomas G.J. Marsden
 2020–Present Col. Simon D. Millar

References 

Groups of the Royal Engineers
Military units and formations established in the 1970s
Organisations based in Moray
Group sized units of the British Army